Principe is a Genoa Metro station, in Genoa, Italy.

It is planned to construct an underpass to connect directly to the nearby Genova Piazza Principe railway station.

References

External links

Genoa Metro stations
Railway stations opened in 1992
1992 establishments in Italy
Railway stations in Italy opened in the 20th century